Ahmet Arslan (born 2 June 1962) is a Turkish politician from the Justice and Development Party (AK Party) who served as the Minister of Transport, Maritime and Communication from 24 May 2016 until 10 July 2018. He is a Member of Parliament for the electoral district of Kars, having first been elected in the November 2015 general election.

Early life and career
Ahmet Arslan was born on 2 June 1962 in the district of Kağızman, Kars Province. He graduated from the National Security Academy and the Istanbul Technical University School of Maritime as a Shipping Construction and Mechanical Engineer. He later became a civil servant, first joining the Maritime Undersecretariat as a Department Manager and Deputy General Manager. He went on to serve at the Ministry of Transport as the Director of the General Directorate of Rail, Ports and Airport Construction (DLH). He also served as an executive board member of the General Directorate of State Airports Authority (DHMİ).

Arslan worked in the private sector for seven years, taking on numerous roles. He also worked at the Pendik Shipyard in İstanbul. He was also a member of the executive boards of TTNET and the Türk Loydu Foundation, while serving on the supervisory board of Türksat. He also served as a member of the Maritime Assembly at the Union of Chambers and Commodity Exchanges of Turkey (TOBB).

Awards
During his early career, he was given the 'Turkish World Engineering Award' and became an honorary Professor, while also receiving the '2010 Annual Bureaucrats who turn negatives into positives' award.

Minister of Transport, Maritime and Communication
Arslan was elected as a Member of Parliament for the electoral district of Kars from the Justice and Development Party (AK Party) in the November 2015 general election. Following the resignation of Prime Minister Ahmet Davutoğlu in May 2016, the AK Party held an Extraordinary Congress on 22 May to elect his successor as leader. Serving Minister of Transport, Maritime and Communication Binali Yıldırım was elected unopposed and formed the 65th government of Turkey on 24 May 2016, appointing Arslan as his successor as Transport Minister.

See also
List of Turkish civil servants

References

External links

MP profile on the Grand National Assembly website
Collection of all relevant news items at Haberler.com

Living people
1962 births
People from Kağızman
Justice and Development Party (Turkey) politicians
Members of the 26th Parliament of Turkey
Members of the 65th government of Turkey
Istanbul Technical University alumni
Deputies of Kars
Turkish civil servants
Ministers of Transport and Communications of Turkey